Bruce Palmer is a musician known for playing in Buffalo Springfield.

Bruce Palmer may also refer to:

 Bruce Palmer (basketball), basketball coach
 Bruce Palmer Jr. (1913–2000), US general, acting Army Chief of Staff in 1972
 Bruce Palmer (judge) (1935–2017), New Zealand lawyer and judge